The Bashilo River (less often known as the Beshitta) is located in  Ethiopia. Known for its canyon, which one source describes as almost as extensive as the canyon of its parent the Abay, also known as the Blue Nile, the river originates just west of Kutaber in the Amhara Region, flowing first to the northwest to where the Tergiya empties into it, then to the southwest to its confluence with the Abay. Its drainage area is about 13,242 square kilometers in size, covering portions of the Semien Gondar, Semien Wollo and Debub Wollo Zones. Its tributaries include the Checheho, and the Walano.

The Bashilo was also important for defining the boundaries of Ethiopian provinces. In the 17th century, it separated Begemder from Amhara. By the late 18th century, it had become the northern boundary of Shewa, as illustrated by the refusal of Emperor Tekle Giyorgis I to cross the Bashilo because they would enter that province. The river remained the northern boundary of Shewa as late as 1870 by Negus Menelik of Shewa in a letter to G.R. Goodfellow.

See also 
 List of rivers of Ethiopia

References

External links 
 Ethiopia Disaster Prevention and Preparedness Agency: Administrative atlas: Amhara region
 Ethiopia Disaster Prevention and Preparedness Agency: Flood Vulnerable Areas as of August 24, 2006

Amhara Region
Rivers of Ethiopia
Tributaries of the Blue Nile